Robert Maragh (25 December 1954 – 10 April 1985) was a Jamaican cricketer. He played in four first-class matches for the Jamaican cricket team from 1956 to 1959.

See also
 List of Jamaican representative cricketers

References

External links
 

1954 births
1985 deaths
Jamaican cricketers
Jamaica cricketers
Sportspeople from Kingston, Jamaica